Duczyński (feminine: Duczyńska; plural: Duczyńscy) is a Polish surname. It may refer to:
 Ilona Duczyńska (1897–1978), Polish-Hungarian female revolutionary and translator
 Irma von Duczynska (1869–1932), Austrian painter and sculptor
  (died 1832), Polish politician
  (1951–2006), Polish theatre producer

See also
 

Polish-language surnames